MOPS or MOPs may refer to:  

 Mean of Platts Singapore
 Memory operations per second, performance capacity of semiconductor memory
 Minimum Operating Performance Standards; see type certificate
 MOPS (3-(N-morpholino)propanesulfonic acid), a buffer used in protein chemistry
 Mops (bat), a genus of bats in the family Molossidae
 The Mops, a Japanese psychedelic rock group
 MOPS International, a Christian organization focused on women and mothers

See also
 Mop